Karen Tobin (born in Pennsylvania) is a female country music singer. After relocating to Los Angeles, California in 1980, Tobin was signed to Arista Records. She released two singles for the label, but no album was ever released. After being discovered by Keith Stegall, she recorded several demos before being signed to a recording contract with Atlantic Records Nashville in 1991. Tobin's debut album, Carolina Smokey Moon, was released in October 1991. The album's first single, the title-track, was made into a video which received airplay on CMT and TNN.

Discography

Albums

"Before It's Too Late"

Release date:  May 5, 2018
Label:  Sunnyland Productions

Singles

References

American women country singers
American country singer-songwriters
Living people
Singer-songwriters from Pennsylvania
Country musicians from Pennsylvania
Year of birth missing (living people)
21st-century American women